Luková is a municipality and village in Ústí nad Orlicí District in the Pardubice Region of the Czech Republic. It has about 800 inhabitants.

Administrative parts
The village of Květná is an administrative part of Luková.

References

Villages in Ústí nad Orlicí District